Plecoptera nebulilinea is a species of moth of the family Noctuidae. It is found in Borneo and the Peninsular Malaysia.

External links
Moths of Borneo

Catocalinae